Chumeh-ye Seyyed Alvan (also Romanized as Chūmeh-ye Seyyed Alvān) is a village in Hoseyni Rural District, in the Central District of Shadegan County, Khuzestan Province, Iran. At the 2006 census, its population was 3,132, in 577 families.

References 

Populated places in Shadegan County